Chicoreus dovi is a species of sea snail, a marine gastropod mollusk in the family Muricidae, the murex snails or rock snails.

Description

Distribution
This marine species occurs off Kenya.

References

 Houart, R., 1984. Description of the new species of Muricidae (Mollusca: Gastropoda) from the eastern african coast: Chicoreus (Chicoreus) dovi n. sp.. Venus 43(1): 55-59

Muricidae
Gastropods described in 1984